Osborn Engineering, is an architectural and engineering firm based in Cleveland, Ohio.  Founded in 1892, it is noted mostly for designing sports stadiums.  More than 100 stadiums have been designed by Osborn, including such famous parks as Fenway Park in Boston, the original Yankee Stadium in New York City, Tiger Stadium in Detroit, and numerous minor league, collegiate, and major league sports facilities in all sports.  They also design other structures, including infrastructure and public sector buildings, industrial and manufacturing, and parking structures.

Structures designed by Osborn Engineering
League Park, 1910
Griffith Stadium, 1911
Polo Grounds reconstruction, 1911
Tiger Stadium, 1912
Braves Field, 1915
Comiskey Park renovations, ca 1920
Sportsman's Park renovations, 1922
Kansas City Municipal Stadium, 1923
Yankee Stadium, 1923
Ross–Ade Stadium, 1924 
Dill Field, 1925
Notre Dame Stadium, 1929
 Ben Hill Griffin Stadium, 1930
Cleveland Municipal Stadium, 1931
Fenway Park renovations, 1934
Milwaukee County Stadium, 1951
Metropolitan Stadium, 1955
RFK Stadium, 1959
WVU Coliseum, 1968
Three Rivers Stadium, 1970
Jacobs Field, 1994
Ohio Stadium 1999-2000 renovations

References

External links
 Osborn Architects & Engineers
 RPI Alumni Hall of Fame

Engineering companies of the United States
Architecture firms based in Ohio
Companies based in Cleveland